Sanford Edmund Lee (born October 11, 1947) is an American politician. He served in the Colorado Senate from the 11th district as a member of the Democratic Party. Prior to his tenure in the state senate he served in the Colorado House of Representatives from the 18th district.

Early life
Sanford Edmund Lee graduated from Ohio Wesleyan University with a bachelor of Arts degree in 1970, attended Wharton School of Finance from 1970 to 1971, and graduated from the University of Akron School of Law with a Juris Doctor in 1975. He married Lynn, with whom he had three children.

State legislature

Elections
Lee ran for a seat in the Colorado House of Representatives from the 18th district and defeated Republican nominee Karen Cullen in the 2010 election. He defeated Republican nominee Jennifer George, Libertarian nominee Robert Melamede, and Constitution nominee Amy Fedde in the 2012 election. He defeated Republican nominee Michael Schlierf in the 2014 election. He defeated Republican nominee Cameron Forth and Libertarian nominee Norman Dawson in the 2016 election.

Michael Merrifield, a member of the Colorado Senate from the 11th district, did not seek reelection in the 2018 election. Lee announced his campaign on September 2, 2017, and defeated Republican nominee Pat McIntire. A petition was issued in 2019 to recall Lee, but it was unsuccessful. He did not run for reelection in 2022.

Tenure

During Lee's tenure in the state house he served on the Education committee and chaired Judiciary committee. During his tenure in the state senate he chaired the Judiciary committee and served as vice-chair of the Finance committee. Lee supported Amy Klobuchar during the 2020 Democratic presidential primaries.

In 2022, Lee was indicted by a grand jury for registering to vote at an address where he did not live, but Judge Eric Bentley dismissed the case due to incorrect residency information being provided to the prosecution.

Political positions
Lee voted against legislation that required Colorado's public employee pension fund to oppose Boycott, Divestment and Sanctions. Lee was among thirty-seven legislators who endorsed a letter in 2018, calling for Planned Parenthood to allow for their workers to form an union. He supported legislation to prohibit the death penalty.

Lee received an A rating from NARAL Pro-Choice America. His scores from the American Civil Liberties Union ranged from 88% in 2013, 100% in 2014, 40% in 2015, 100% in 2016, 100% in 2017, 100% in 2018, and 80% in 2019.

Electoral history

References

1947 births
Living people
Colorado lawyers
Democratic Party members of the Colorado House of Representatives
Ohio Wesleyan University alumni
Politicians from Colorado Springs, Colorado
University of Akron alumni
Wharton School of the University of Pennsylvania alumni
21st-century American politicians
Democratic Party Colorado state senators